John Alker (fl. 1797–1832), aka Alker of Wigan, was one of a family of longcase clock makers from Wigan, Lancashire.

Bibliography
Davies E.: Greater Manchester Clocks and Clockmakers
Hawkes A.J.: The Clockmakers & Watchmakers of Wigan 1650 - 1850

External links

The Long Case Clock: The Science and Engineering that Goes Into a Grandfather Clock - Jessica Chappell
Historical Clock and Watch Research
Edward Baines' Directory of Wigan, 1825
Lancashire Quarter Sessions - National Archives

English clockmakers
People from Wigan
Year of death missing
Year of birth missing